FC Saint-Jean-le-Blanc is a French football club founded in 1969. It is based in the commune Saint-Jean-le-Blanc, Loiret, and plays its home games at Stade Lionel Charbonnier.

For the 2020–21 season, the first team will play in the Championnat National 3, the fifth level in France, after being promoted thanks to its fourth place in Régional 1 during the 2019–20 season.

The reserve team plays in Régional 2, and the club also has a third team in D2. The senior woman's team is playing in Régional 2 for the second consecutive year.

References

External links
FC Saint-Jean-le-Blanc official website 

1969 establishments in France
Association football clubs established in 1969
Football clubs in France
Sport in Loiret
Football clubs in Centre-Val de Loire